Nate Brakeley (born August 31, 1989) is an American rugby union player who plays lock and flanker for Rugby New York (Ironworkers) of Major League Rugby (MLR) and for the United States men's national team. Brakeley also plays for the New York Athletic Club.

Early life
After graduating from St. John's Preparatory School, where he was a member of the school's rugby team, Brakeley attended Dartmouth College. While there, Brakeley was a member of the Dartmouth Rugby team that won Collegiate Rugby Championships in 2011 and 2012. Brakeley also attended Cambridge University, where he earned an MPhil in energy technology. While at Cambridge, Brakeley played for the Cambridge University rugby team and participated in the 2012 Varsity Match—a 26–19 defeat to Oxford. After returning to the United States, Brakeley played for Cambridge's touring team for one match against the Men's Collegiate All-Americans.

Club career
Brakeley joined Rugby United New York (RUNY) for their inaugural season as an associate member of Major League Rugby in 2018. Brakeley started at lock in each of RUNY's three exhibitions against the Ontario Arrows and Boston Mystics in March 2018.

International career

USA Selects
In September 2018, it was announced that Brakeley had been selected for the USA Selects roster for the 2018 Americas Pacific Challenge.

USA Eagles
Brakeley made his debut with the USA Eagles on February 13, 2016, starting at flanker in the Eagles' 30–22 victory over Canada in the 2016 Americas Rugby Championship. Brakeley scored his first try for the Eagles in the Eagles' 52–16 victory over Canada on July 1, 2017, in a qualification match for the 2019 World Cup.

References

1989 births
Living people
American rugby union players
United States international rugby union players
Rugby union locks
Rugby union flankers
Cambridge University R.U.F.C. players
Rugby New York players